Kubly is a surname. Notable people with the surname include:

 Gary Kubly (1943–2012), American politician
 Herbert Kubly (1915–1996), American writer and playwright

See also
 Kuby